Uncharted Territory, LLC is an American film production company based in Los Angeles, California. UT was founded in 1999 by Academy Award winning visual effects supervisor and producer Volker Engel and Emmy award winning VFX supervisor and producer Marc Weigert. Engel and Weigert usually serve as producers or co-producers and visual effects supervisors on the company's projects. 

With their first production, the adventure movie Coronado in 2001, UT started a new paradigm for handling visual effects. Instead of contracting out to other established VFX houses, UT would build up a VFX crew from scratch by selecting freelance artists, managers and programmers and creating the necessary infrastructure (hardware and software), custom tailored to a single project only.

This in-house VFX crew has  included (as in the case of the production 2012) as many as 100 people.

The company has had for a short term a subsidiary in Munich: Uncharted Territory GmbH.

Overall-work productions 
 Coronado (2003)
 Dark Kingdom: The Dragon King (2004)
 The Triangle (2005)

Visual effects productions
 Coronado (2003)
 Dark Kingdom: The Dragon King (2004)
 The Day After Tomorrow (2004)
 The Triangle (2005)
 2012 (2009)
 Anonymous (2011)
 White House Down (2013)
 Independence Day: Resurgence (2016)

References

External links
 

American animation studios
Mass media companies established in 1999
Computer animation
Special effects companies
Visual effects companies
1999 establishments in California